Madera Community College, established in 2020, is a community college located in Madera, California. It originally opened in 1996 as Madera Community College Center, a campus of the State Center Community College District.

References

External links
Madera Community College

California Community Colleges
2020 establishments in California
Education in Madera County, California